General elections are held in the Autonomous Region in Muslim Mindanao for the Regional Governor and Vice-Governor were held on September 9, 1996. Comelec conducted the pilot test for their computerized counting system during this election.

Results

For Regional Governor

|-
! style="background-color:#E9E9E9;text-align:left;vertical-align:top;" |Candidate
! style="background-color:#E9E9E9;text-align:left;vertical-align:top;" |Party
|-
| style="text-align:left;" | Nurallaj Misuari 
| style="text-align:left;" | Lakas-NUCD-UMDP 
|-
|}

For Regional Vice-Governor

|-
! style="background-color:#E9E9E9;text-align:left;vertical-align:top;" |Candidate
! style="background-color:#E9E9E9;text-align:left;vertical-align:top;" |Party
|-
| style="text-align:left;" | Guimid P. Matalam 
| style="text-align:left;" | Lakas-NUCD-UMDP 
|-
|}

References

See also
Commission on Elections
Politics of the Philippines
Philippine elections

1996
1996 elections in the Philippines